Steven Anderson is a professional basketball referee who worked in the National Basketball Association (NBA) for four seasons (2013-2017). He wore the uniform number 35.

Anderson resides in Orlando, Florida. He is an alumnus of the University of Central Florida, from where he received a bachelor's degree in education and a master's degree in higher education. He has been an international basketball official for FIBA since 2011. He was selected to officiate at the 2014 FIBA World Cup and worked the third-place game. He was selected to officiate at the 2016 Summer Olympics in Rio de Janeiro, where he was the only American to referee games for the 2016 Summer Olympics Men's basketball tournament. In 2021, Anderson was once again chosen to officiate for the 2020 Summer Olympics Men's basketball tournament at the 2020 Summer Olympics, along with fellow American Amy Bonner.

References

Year of birth missing (living people)
Living people
National Basketball Association referees
Sportspeople from Orlando, Florida
University of Central Florida alumni
Basketball people from Florida